Adrián Berbia Pose (born 12 October 1977 in Montevideo) is a Uruguayan goalkeeper currently playing for Boston River in the Uruguayan Primera División.

Career
Berbia signed with Uruguayan Primera B club Boston River in 2015 after being out of contract for 6 months. After the 2015–16 season, the club was promoted to the Primera División and, following a successful first season in the Primera, participated in the 2017 Copa Sudamericana.

International career
Berbia has made two appearances for the senior, Uruguay national football team, both at the Copa América 2001.

References

External links
 
 

1977 births
Living people
Footballers from Montevideo
Uruguayan footballers
Uruguay international footballers
Association football goalkeepers
Uruguayan Primera División players
Chilean Primera División players
Categoría Primera A players
C.A. Bella Vista players
Peñarol players
C.A. Cerro players
Liverpool F.C. (Montevideo) players
Club Olimpia footballers
Expatriate footballers in Paraguay
O'Higgins F.C. footballers
América de Cali footballers
Atlético Junior footballers
Real Cartagena footballers
Miramar Misiones players
Expatriate footballers in Chile
Expatriate footballers in Colombia
Uruguayan expatriate footballers
2001 Copa América players
Uruguayan expatriate sportspeople in Chile
Uruguayan expatriate sportspeople in Colombia